Modern Terminals Limited (Modern Terminals or MTL), is the second largest container terminal operator in Hong Kong, just after Hongkong International Terminals Limited. It operates terminal 1, 2, 5 and 9 (South) in Kwai Tsing Container Terminals in Hong Kong, and also sets up joint-venture in container terminals in Shenzhen, Guangdong and Taicang, Jiangsu in Mainland China.

In 1990s, the major shareholder were the Wharf (Holdings), China Merchants Holdings (International), Swire Pacific.

Swire Pacific sold all the shares of MTL to the Wharf (Holdings) and China Merchants Holdings (International) in 2003. It is now the subsidiary of Wharf (Holdings) and its shareholders are Wharf (Holdings), China Merchants Holdings (International) and Jebsen Group.

References

External links

Modern Terminals Limited

Port operating companies
Ports and harbours of Hong Kong
Transport companies established in 1969
1969 establishments in Hong Kong
Kwai Tsing District
Kwai Chung
Tsing Yi
The Wharf (Holdings)
China Merchants
1994 mergers and acquisitions
2001 mergers and acquisitions
2003 mergers and acquisitions
2005 mergers and acquisitions